Anna Haugh (born 6 November 1980) is an Irish chef, restaurateur and TV personality.

Biography
Born in Dublin, Haugh grew up in Tallaght. She attended Presentation Secondary School in Terenure and trained on a professional cookery course at the TU Dublin School of Culinary Arts and Food Technology in Dublin. She began her career in the city, with Derry Clarke of L'Ecrivain. Haugh then moved to London where she worked with Philip Howard, Shane Osborn and Gordon Ramsay. Haugh also worked with Gualtiero Marchesi in Paris.

In May 2019, she founded the Myrtle Restaurant in Chelsea, London, named after Myrtle Allen, Irish Michelin star-winning head chef and co-founder of Ballymaloe House.

Television
Haugh's first documented role in television was in BBC's The Stress Test (2004) while working at Pied à Terre with Shane Osborn. She appeared as a guest judge on Gordon Ramsey's U.S. show Hell's Kitchen in 2013 and is a chef on BBC's Ready Steady Cook presented by Rylan Clark-Neal.

Haugh co-presented two seasons of BBC's Royal Recipes with Michael Buerk, has appeared as a guest judge on Masterchef with John Torode and Gregg Wallace and as a guest on Sunday Brunch with Simon Rimmer and Tim Lovejoy. She has also appeared as a guest on Tastemade with Numra Siddiqui.

In 2020 Anna competed in and won an episode of Channel 4's Snackmasters against Michelin starred chef Aktar Islam.

Anna regularly appears on Saturday Kitchen and is a resident chef on Morning Live with Kym Marsh and Gethin Jones.

In 2022, it was announced that Haugh would replace Monica Galetti as a judge on Masterchef: The Professionals.

Haugh was the guest chef who set the dish challenges for the contestants on the BBC's Celebrity Masterchef, in the 11th episode (Series 17) which was broadcast in September 2022. The contestants in the episode were Lisa Snowdon, Kitty Scott-Claus, Katya Jones and Ryan Thomas.

Awards
In 2019, Haugh won Best International Chef award at the FOOD AND WINE Awards.

Myrtle Restaurant, located on Langton Street, London was awarded 3 AA Rosettes in 2021.

References and sources

1980 births
Irish chefs
Living people